Wedding Campaign is 2005 South Korean film about two aging bachelor farmers from Gyeongsang Province. Unable to find wives in Korea willing to move to the countryside, they go on a 10-day "campaign" in Uzbekistan, where local matchmakers attempt to pair them up with local ethnic Korean women. It was the closing film of the 2005 Pusan International Film Festival.

Plot
Hong Man-taek is a 38-year-old bachelor who at his age is still unable to meet eyes with a woman. Whenever his mother complains "Never had luck with men, never had luck with sons," he feels guilty about not having found a bride yet. Man-taek's old friend Hee-chul thinks he is a lady killer, but he's only a bit more experienced than his basket case friend. Urged on by his grandfather, the two bachelor buddies embark on a matchmaking journey to Uzbekistan to find wives. The trip to Uzbekistan begins with anxiety and hope. While Hee-chul musters all his suaveness and broken English to appeal to the women, Man-taek gets rejected again and again. Even more frustrated than Man-taek himself is Lara, their matchmaker-cum-interpreter. There is a special reason why she must find a bride for Man-taek, and she decides to give special private lessons on language and manners to achieve their common goal.

Cast
Jung Jae-young - Hong Man-taek 
Soo Ae - Kim Lara 
Yoo Jun-sang - Hee-chul
Kwon Tae-won - co. president 
Park Kil-soo - Doo-sik 
Kim Eung-soo - village elder
Kim Jin-goo - Chun-bo's mother
Kim Ji-young - Man-taek's mother
Jeon Sang-jin - Sang-jin
Shin Eun-kyun - Alona
Kim Won-sik - young Man-taek 
Jung Tae-woo - young Hee-chul
Kim Sung-kyum - Man-taek's grandfather
Kim Ji-young - bride

See also 

Mail-order bride

References

External links

2005 films
South Korean comedy-drama films
2000s South Korean films